A frontal horn cyst or connatal cyst is a cystic area in the brain.  They are sometimes found in newborn babies and do not appear to cause any developmental problems.  It is adjacent to the superolateral margin of the body and frontal horn of the lateral ventricles, and are believed to represent a normal variant with no effect on neurological development. On ultrasound imaging, the outward most part of the ventricles has rounded appearance, giving the cystic appearance.

References

Cysts